Westinghouse Park is a city-block sized municipal park in Pittsburgh, Pennsylvania.

The park land is the former estate of George Westinghouse, an American entrepreneur and engineer, and his wife Marguerite.  With an area of about 10 acres, it was the site of his mansion known as Solitude.  At this house, Westinghouse worked with his engineers, including Nikola Tesla, and entertained notable people of the day, including scientist William Thomson (Lord Kelvin), and congressman and later president William McKinley.  Close by was another building, a carriage house, that housed his private laboratory in the basement. There, he developed some of his residential electric lighting technology, installing a generator and running cables to the main house, with wires that were left exposed on the interior walls, so as not to cut into the woodwork.  Also there, Westinghouse invented methods to control and transmit natural gas for both industrial and residential consumers. In the winter of 1883/1884, seeking a source of natural gas in his own "back yard," Westinghouse ordered drilling on his estate.  When gas was struck on May 22, 1884, a blowout resulted in the uncontrolled release of gas for about a week.  Westinghouse devised a way to cap the well.  An illumination test was conducted by igniting the gas jet at the top of a tall pipe.  It initially produced a 100-foot flame that illuminated a mile-wide area to a brightness sufficient to read a newspaper.  This well was designated as "Westinghouse Well No. 1" or "Old No. 1" to distinguish it from several other wells that were drilled in the area.  Eventually, several natural gas derricks towered above the estate's Victorian gardens.   In modern times there is no above-ground trace left of these derricks.

History
The park's history began when Westinghouse, upon his death in 1914, bequeathed the North Point Breeze mansion to his son, who in turn sold the property in 1918 to the Engineers' Society of Western Pennsylvania. The Society's intent was to establish both a city park and a memorial to Westinghouse there. As per a deed stipulation, the house was razed in 1919 and the park was developed; the Westinghouse Memorial, however, was erected  a few miles away in Schenley Park.  

Westinghouse Park today is maintained by the City of Pittsburgh. The park hosts a well-used children's playground, a basketball court, and a community building used for meetings and as a 14th Ward polling (voting) station.  Disused tunnels are still in evidence from the site of the former house to the laboratory and to the nearby railroad tracks.  The park is bounded on three sides by residential streets of the North Point Breeze neighborhood, while on its north side are rail lines and a busway.  On its southern side, across Thomas Boulevard, was the former estate of industrialist and entrepreneur H. J. Heinz, with a mansion known as Greenlawn, now replaced by smaller, mostly early 20th century residences.  Within sight of the Park are the still-extant houses of Westinghouse's son on Murtland Avenue and of his personal physician on Thomas Blvd. Nearby in Point Breeze on Penn Avenue is the  mansion called Clayton, on the former estate of industrialist Henry Clay Frick. 

Writer John Edgar Wideman made frequent references to the park in his books. Both of his memoirs, Brothers and Keepers and Hoop Roots, use the park as a setting, as does his fictional Homewood Trilogy.

In 2006, archeological exploration found numerous small artifacts and reestablished the location of the long-vanished gas well.  An excellent view of the park, showing some of the ancient specimen trees, can be found at Ref.

In 2019, the Westinghouse Park 2nd Century Coalition was formed to improve the park's facilities, explore and exhibit its Westinghouse history, and to provide it with on-going stewardship. See external link below.

Gallery
Shown here are several images related to the historic Westinghouse Park site.   First is a photograph of the mansion Solitude seen from the east, from Lang Avenue.  One sees a three-story house with a four-story tower and a mansard roof. An enclosed porch wraps around to the south.  Sun awnings on the windows and leafy trees indicate a summer setting.  The excellent condition of the house suggests the photograph predates the death of George Westinghouse in 1914.  Next is another photo of the same house from the south, from about the distance of Thomas Boulevard.  A corner of the former greenhouse is seen on the far left.  Next is a photograph taken before 1890 of the gas derrick that became known as the "Westinghouse Old No.1" well in present-day Westinghouse Park. This picture shows also the carriage house and the mansion Solitude on the far right.  A second derrick is also visible.  The view is from the south, from present-day Thomas Boulevard.  Small figures of children and workers can be seen near the well.  An article in Harper's Weekly in 1885 featured an article on "The Gas Wells of Pennsylvania," and included an engraving of Westinghouse's "Old No.1" derrick flaming as an "illuminator" at night. The article extolls the revolutionary nature of using cheap natural gas as an alternative to dirty and expensive coal by industry and households, and the bonanza the recent discovery of this resource in Western Pennsylvania would bring to the economy of the region.

References

External links

Westinghouse Park 2nd Century Coalition - http://www.westinghousepark.org

Parks in Pittsburgh
Urban public parks